The Moray Eels Eat the Space Needle is the second album by the American band Space Needle, released in 1997. Its title is a tribute to a 1968 album by the Holy Modal Rounders. The album artwork is by the British artist Roger Dean.

Critical reception
Entertainment Weekly wrote: "Whereas Space Needle genuinely broke new ground with the eerie, distortion-drenched sound collages of their debut, they now seem a bizarre parody of themselves, liberally mixing several of the most self-indulgent musical genres—from free jazz to prog rock—into one overlong, soporific outing." The Austin Chronicle thought that "Space Needle just can't seem to make up their mind about whether they want to be cacophonous feedback pushers or subtle purveyors of sweet melody."

Spin deemed the album "a handful of pretty 'lullabies' encased in an infinitely longer handful of space rock instrumentals."

Track listing
 "Where The Fuck's My Wallet" (Ehrbar, Gatland, Parker) 13:20
 "Flowers For Algernon" (Ehrbar, Gatland, Parker) 7:47
 "Never Lonely Alone" (Ehrbar) 3:57
 "Love Left Us Strangers" (Ehrbar) 4:00
 "Hyapatia Lee" (Buckholtz, Ehrbar, Gatland, Parker) 9:29
 "Old Spice" (Ehrbar) 3:21
 "Hot For Krishna" (Buckholtz, Ehrbar, Gatland, Parker) 2:33
 "More Than Goodnight" (Ehrbar) 3:56
 "Bladewash" (Ehrbar, Gatland, Parker) 11:44
 "One Kind Of Lullaby" (Parker) 6:11

Personnel
 Jud Ehrbar - drums, vocals, keyboards, guitars, percussion
 Jeff Gatland - guitars, percussion
 Anders Parker - guitars, vocals, drums, percussion

Additional personnel
 Max Buckholtz - violin

References

Space Needle (band) albums
1997 albums
Albums with cover art by Roger Dean (artist)